Zunud (also, Zunut and Zunut-Dag-Dibi) is a village and municipality in the Shaki Rayon of Azerbaijan.  It has a population of 1,270.

References 

Populated places in Shaki District